Copris repertus, is a species of dung beetle found in India, Sri Lanka and Myanmar.

Description
This broadly oval, highly convex species has an average length of about 16 to 22 mm. Body black and shiny. Antennae, and mouthparts are red colored. Reddish bristles upon the legs and lower surface. Head semicircular, with rugulose clypeus. Pronotum very shiny, with a strong longitudinal groove along the middle. Elytra lightly striate, except at the base and apex with minutely punctured. In the head of the male, there is a slender, feebly curved, erect horn. In female, there is a short, transverse, elevated carina in head.

Adults are observed from both old and fresh elephant dungs. Habitat is montane tropical forest, secondary tropical forest and secondary savannah.

References

Scarabaeinae
Insects of Sri Lanka
Insects of India
Insects described in 1858